The Governor of Upnor Castle was a military officer who commanded the fortifications at Upnor Castle, part of the defenses of the Medway estuary. Upnor became largely obsolete as a fortress after 1668, but it continued to serve as a magazine and ordnance facility until 1945.

Governors of Upnor
?–1694: Robert Mynors Esq.
1695–1696: Sir Thomas Taylor, 2nd Baronet
1697: Edward Rouse
?–1711: Edward Hastings
1711–1733: John Webb
bef. 1756–1775: William Deane
1775–1778: James Murray
1778–1784: William Brown
1784–1796: Paulus Aemilius Irving
1796–1816: Jeffrey Amherst 
1816–1835: Alexander Lawrence

References

Military history of Kent
Upnor Castle